Sixt von Armin is a surname. Notable people with the surname include:

Friedrich Sixt von Armin (1851–1936), German general
Hans-Heinrich Sixt von Armin (1890–1952), German general, son of Friedrich